The Central Radio & TV Tower is a  telecommunications- and observation tower in Beijing, China. It was the tallest structure in the city until 2018, when it was surpassed by China Zun. The tower provides panoramic views over the city from its revolving restaurant and observation deck. It is a member of the World Federation of Great Towers.

History 
The tower was completed in 1992, designed by Paulus Snoeren in the late 1980s and contains broadcasting equipment for China Central Television.  It is located in Beijing's Haidian District, near to the Gongzhufen metro station and Yuyuantan Park. The CCTV Headquarters is now based in Chaoyang District, designed by Rem Koolhaas in late 2009.

A race to the top of the tower is held annually with two laps of the base followed by a climb of the 1,484 steps leading up to the observation deck.

Floors
There are 4 floors opened to the public.

Floor 1 
Lounge, toilets, lift to level 216 (level 4 for guest) and stairs to level 2.

Floor 2 
History of very famous people in China, lift to level 186 (Level 3 for guest), lift to level 216 (level 4 for guest) and stairs to level 1.

Floor 3 
How CCTV (Chinese TV programme) work, lift to level 2 lift to level 216 (level 4 for guest).

Floor 4 
Viewing area, lift to level 183 (level 3 for guest).

Gallery

See also
 List of tallest buildings in Beijing
 List of tallest towers in the world
 List of tallest freestanding structures in the world
 Fernsehturm Stuttgart – first TV tower built from concrete and prototype
Media buildings in Beijing
 China Media Group Headquarters
 CCTV Headquarters (another building that is sometimes also called "CCTV Tower")
 Beijing Television Cultural Center
 Beijing TV Centre
 Phoenix Center

References

External links
 Central TV Tower Tourist Website: https://web.archive.org/web/20111211210149/http://en.ctvt.com.cn/
 

China Central Television
Buildings and structures in Haidian District
Towers completed in 1992
1992 establishments in China
Tourist attractions in Beijing
Observation towers in China
Communication towers in China
Towers with revolving restaurants